The Secret of the Forest was the first film directed by Darcy Conyers. It was produced by Ryant Pictures for the Children's Film Foundation (CFF). The storyline was developed by George Ewart Evans following a formula already developed by the CFF.

Locations
The film was inspired by the late 1930s archaeological discovery of Sutton Hoo. The film was made on location in Suffolk including scenes in Ipswich Museum, Rendlesham Forest and on the Deben River.

References

External links
 The Secret of the Forest Film available to view at East Anglian Film Archive

1956 films
Children's Film Foundation
1950s British films
British black-and-white films